The Spanish Army Air Defence Command (Spanish: Mando de Artillería Antiaérea, MAAA) is a command of the Spanish Army, composed of anti-air artillery units under a same command, formed, trained and equipped to contribute, into a joint or joint/combined frame, to the air space control and defense. Those units may act either in the national  territory or as a reinforcement to allied organization based on the joint and Army specific doctrine.

The MAAA is composed of a General Quarter and a set of anti-aircraft artillery units and units of combat support.

The units belonging to the MAAA are:
 71st Anti-air Artillery Regiment in Madrid with Mistral surface-to-air missiles and 35/90 Guns 
 73rd Anti-air Artillery Regiment in Cartagena with Skyguard-Aspide surface-to-air missile systems and NASAMS surface-to-air missile systems, also in Valencia with MIM-104 Patriot surface-to-air missile systems
 74th Anti-air Artillery Regiment in Sevilla with HAWK PIP III surface-to-air missile systems
 Signal Battalion in Madrid

The 94th Anti-air Artillery Regiment, which fields NASAMS surface-to-air missile systems falls under operational control of the Canarias General Command.

The 72nd Anti-Air Artillery Regiment was disbanded in December 2015.

See also
 Structure of the Spanish Army

References

Army units and formations of Spain
Air defence units and formations